Definitive Jux was a record label based in New York City. It was co-founded in 1999 by El-P and Amaechi Uzoigwe.

History
Definitive Jux was initially known as Def Jux. However, popular hip hop label Def Jam Recordings sued Def Jux over the name similarity in 2001. This lawsuit was settled out of court and the name was officially changed to Definitive Jux.

In February 2010, El-P announced that the label, although it will carry on selling its catalog and merchandise, would be put "on hiatus" as a traditional record label, and that it would be going through some changes in order to keep up with the evolution of the music industry. He also announced that he was stepping down as artistic director of Definitive Jux to focus on producing and being a full-time artist.

Roster

 Aesop Rock
 Cage
 Camu Tao (deceased)
 Cannibal Ox
 Company Flow
 Cool Calm Pete
 C-Rayz Walz
 Danny!
 Del the Funky Homosapien
 Despot
 El-P
 Hangar 18
 Mike Ladd
 Mr. Lif
 Murs
 Party Fun Action Committee
 RJD2
 Rob Sonic
 S.A. Smash
 Sonic Sum
 The Mighty Underdogs
 The Perceptionists
 The Weathermen
 Yak Ballz

Discography

See also 
 List of record labels
 Underground hip hop

References

External links

American independent record labels
American hip hop record labels
Record labels established in 1999
1999 establishments in New York City